The Lasi are a Sindhi tribal group of Balochistan, Pakistan. They form 3.5% of the total population of the province (as of 1961), and are the predominant group in the lowlands of Lasbela District. They occupy a high social position and have traditionally been engaged as agricultural landlords. They speak the Lasi dialect of Sindhi. Although social stratification is found in individual tribes, there is no social hierarchy or rigid tribal structure. The Lasi include the following tribes:Channa, Baradia langha,Abra, Angaria, Burra, Dambi, Gidri, Gunga, Gwaranjo, Jamot, Doda, Kundola, Mandra, Mangia, Maswhani, Masuni, Moosiani, Runjha, Samot, Shahok, Sheikh, Sithar and Zuar.bapra

References

Bibliography 

Social groups of Balochistan, Pakistan
Sindhi tribes